This is a list of foreign ministers of Djibouti.

1977–1978: Abdallah Mohamed Kamil
1978–1993: Moumin Bahdon Farah
1993–1995: Mohamed Bolock Abdou
1995–1999: Mohamed Moussa Chehem
1999–2005: Ali Abdi Farah
2005–present: Mahamoud Ali Youssouf

Sources
Rulers.org – Foreign ministers A–D

Foreign
Foreign Ministers
Politicians
Foreign Ministers of Djibouti